Sixhills is a village in the West Lindsey district of Lincolnshire, England, about  south-east from Market Rasen. It lies just south of the A631 between Market Rasen and Ludford. It is in the civil parish of North Willingham.

The Church of All Saints was designed by James Fowler (1869 and 1875).

Gilbertine nunnery
The village was the site of a former nunnery of the Gilbertine Order, founded in the twelfth century.  At the behest of Edward I Gwladys ferch Dafydd was sent there; she remained until her death in 1336. Scottish Princess Christina Bruce was also imprisoned there from 1306 to 1315.

References

External links

 The Priory of Sixhills at British History Online

Villages in Lincolnshire
West Lindsey District
Gilbertine nunneries